Rampage Puzzle Attack is a puzzle game for Game Boy Advance, developed by Finnish development house Ninai Games and published by Midway Games.

The game is a clone of the puzzle game Drop Mania and based on the Rampage characters. At the beginning of the game, the three characters from the original game, George, Lizzie and Ralph, are available, but more characters who appeared in other games of the series can be unlocked through the Rescue mode. The characters appear on screen during the gameplay, climbing the side of the play arena or being caged at the bottom. The game uses password saves to track player progress.

It was the first console game to be developed in Finland.

Gameplay 

Gameplay-wise, the game is similar to Ninai's earlier games in the Drop Mania series and Super Puzzle Fighter II Turbo.

The basic idea is that the player drops two colored blocks at a time to the playfield. The blocks then merge into contiguous areas. When the player drops a flashing "detoblock" of matching color to touch the area, the entire area is removed and scored. This can lead to chains and combos, and to higher scores.

The game includes a single- and two-player modes. The following modes are available in single-player:
 Clear mode - Includes various areas that need to be cleared to advance to the next level.
 Puzzle mode - Similar to Clear mode, but there are only a limited number of blocks.
 Rescue mode - A cage is added to the bottom of the playfield, and the idea is to remove the blocks on top before the time runs out.
 Marathon mode - There's no set conditions of win, the game continues until it's impossible to keep going.

Two-player modes include Rescue mode, Score mode (competition for higher score) and Attack mode.

Reception 

The game received "average" reviews according to the review aggregation website Metacritic.

References

External links 
 
 

2001 video games
Game Boy Advance games
Game Boy Advance-only games
Midway video games
Puzzle video games
Puzzle Attack
Video games developed in Finland
Video games scored by Jonne Valtonen
Multiplayer and single-player video games